Bhaskara's Lemma is an identity used as a lemma during the chakravala method. It states that:
 
for integers  and non-zero integer .

Proof

 
 

So long as neither  nor  are zero, the implication goes in both directions.  (The lemma holds for real or complex numbers as well as integers.)

References
C. O. Selenius, "Rationale of the chakravala process of Jayadeva and Bhaskara II", Historia Mathematica, 2 (1975), 167-184. 
C. O. Selenius, Kettenbruch theoretische Erklarung der zyklischen Methode zur Losung der Bhaskara-Pell-Gleichung, Acta Acad. Abo. Math. Phys. 23 (10) (1963).
George Gheverghese Joseph, The Crest of the Peacock: Non-European Roots of Mathematics (1975).

External links
Introduction to chakravala

Diophantine equations
Number theoretic algorithms
Lemmas in algebra
Indian mathematics
Articles containing proofs